The 1974 United States Senate elections were held on November 4, with the 34 seats of Class 3 contested in regular elections. They occurred in the wake of the Watergate scandal, Richard M. Nixon's resignation from the presidency, and Gerald Ford's subsequent pardon of Nixon. Economic issues, specifically inflation and stagnation, were also a factor that contributed to Republican losses. As an immediate result of the November 1974 elections, Democrats made a net gain of three seats from the Republicans, as they defeated Republican incumbents in Colorado and Kentucky and picked up open seats in Florida and Vermont, while Republicans won the open seat in Nevada. Following the elections, at the beginning of the 94th U.S. Congress, the Democratic caucus controlled 61 seats (including one independent), and the Republican caucus controlled 38 seats (including one Conservative).

Democrats gained an additional seat, bringing the net pick-up to four seats, in 1975, when Democrat John A. Durkin won a disputed election in New Hampshire that was unintentionally held after the 1974 election resulted in two recounts and an extended dispute in the Senate. Durkin's Senate term began in September 1975 following his victory in that election. , this is the most recent election in which a Democrat has been elected Senator from Idaho. 

Several other Republican incumbents won very close races; Milton Young of North Dakota won reelection against Democrat William L. Guy by only 186 votes and Henry Bellmon of Oklahoma won reelection against Democrat Ed Edmondson by half a percent of the vote. Bob Dole of Kansas survived the closest election of his career against Democratic Rep. William Roy, a race undoubtedly made close due to Dole's close association with Nixon as chairman of the Republican National Committee. It was the closest the Democrats have come to winning a Senate election in Kansas since George McGill won re-election in 1932.

Results summary

Source: Office of the Clerk of the United States House of Representatives

Gains, losses, and holds

Retirements
Four Republicans and three Democrats retired instead of seeking re-election.

Defeats
Two Republicans and two Democrats sought re-election but lost in the primary or general election.

Change in composition

Before the elections 
After the January 4, 1974 appointment in Ohio.

After the general elections

Race summary

Elections leading to the next Congress 
In these general elections, the winners were elected for the term beginning January 3, 1975; ordered by state.

All of the elections involved the Class 3 seats.

Closest races 

In fourteen races the margin of victory was under 10%.

Illinois was the tipping point state with a margin of 25%.

Alabama 

Democratic United States senator James Allen won re-election to a second term, faced no Republican opponent in the general election, defeating Prohibition Party nominee Alvin Abercrombie.

Alaska 

Incumbent Democrat Mike Gravel won re-election to a second term over Republican State Senator Clyde "C.R." Lewis.

Arizona 

Incumbent Republican Barry Goldwater decided to run for reelection to a fourth term, after returning to the U.S. Senate in 1968 following his failed Presidential run in 1964 against Lyndon B. Johnson. Goldwater defeated Democratic Party nominee philanthropist Jonathan Marshall in the general election.

{{Election box winning candidate with party link no change
 | party      = Democratic Party (US)
 | candidate  = Jonathan Marshall, philanthropist
 | votes      = 79,225
 | percentage = 53.55
}}

 Arkansas 

Incumbent Democrat J. William Fulbright lost renomination to Governor of Arkansas Dale Bumpers. Bumpers then won the general election easily.

 California 

Incumbent Democrat Alan Cranston won re-election to a second term over Republican H. L. Richardson, California State Senator.

 Colorado 

Incumbent Republican Peter H. Dominick ran for re-election to a third term, but was defeated by Democratic challenger Gary Hart, the campaign manager for George McGovern in 1972.

 Connecticut 

Incumbent Democrat Abraham Ribicoff won re-election to a third term over Republican  challenger James Brannen III.

 Florida 

Incumbent Republican Edward Gurney declined to seek a second term after being indicted for taking bribes in return for his influence with the Federal Housing Administration.

The primary for the Republican nomination pitted Eckerd drug store owner Jack Eckerd against Florida Public Service Commissioner Paula Hawkins. Eckerd won handily, receiving approximately 67.5% of the vote.

The Democratic primary, however, was a crowded field with eleven candidates vying for the nomination. Because no candidate received a majority of the votes, U.S. Representative Bill Gunter and Secretary of State of Florida Richard Stone advanced to a run-off election. Stone won by a small margin of 1.68%.

Thus, Eckerd and Stone faced off in the general election. John Grady, a family physician and member of George Wallace's American Independent Party, performed exceptionally well for a third party candidate. Grady may have split the conservative vote, allowing for Stone to win. On election day, Stone received 43.38% of the vote, Eckerd garnered 40.91% of the vote, and Grady acquired 15.7% of the vote.

 Georgia 

Incumbent Democrat Herman Talmadge won re-election to a fourth term over Republican challenger Jerry Johnson.

 Hawaii 

Incumbent Democrat Daniel Inouye won re-election to a third term over Republican challenger James D. Kimmel.

 Idaho 

Incumbent Democrat Frank Church won re-election to a fourth term in office, defeating Republican Bob Smith.

 Illinois 

Incumbent Democratic U.S. Senator Adlai Stevenson III, who was first elected in a special election in 1970, was re-elected to a second term in office, defeating Republican George Burditt by a large margin of nearly 800,000 votes.

 Indiana 

Incumbent Democratic U.S. Senator Birch Bayh was re-elected to a third consecutive term in office, defeating Mayor of Indianapolis Richard Lugar.

 Iowa 

Incumbent Democratic U.S. Senator Harold E. Hughes retired instead of seeking a second term. This open seat was won by five-term U.S. Representative John C. Culver, defeating Republican State Representative David M. Stanley. Culver just like Hughes six years prior, defeated Stanley by a margin of less than one point.

 Kansas 

In what would be the closest election of his 35-year Congressional career, Bob Dole won his second term by 15,533 votes over William R. Roy, a Topeka physician and two-term Representative from Kansas's 2nd Congressional District. Dole suffered due to his close association with President Nixon as chairman of the Republican National Committee in 1971 and 1972.

 Kentucky 

Incumbent Republican U.S. Senator Marlow Cook ran for a second term in office but was defeated by Democratic Governor of Kentucky Wendell Ford.

 Louisiana 

Incumbent Democratic Senator Russell B. Long was unopposed for re-election to a sixth term in office.

 Maryland 

Incumbent Republican Charles Mathias won re-election to a second term.  As a Republican representing heavily-Democratic Maryland, Mathias faced a potentially difficult re-election bid for the 1974 election. State Democrats nominated Barbara Mikulski, then a Baltimore City Councilwoman who was well-known to residents in her city as a social activist, but with limited name recognition in the rest of the state. Mathias was renominated by Republicans, fending off a primary election challenge from conservative doctor Ross Pierpont. Pierpont was never a substantial threat to Mathias, whose lack of competition was due in part to fallout from the Watergate scandal.

As an advocate for campaign finance reform, Mathias refused to accept any contribution over $100 to "avoid the curse of big money that has led to so much trouble in the last year". However, he still managed to raise over $250,000, nearly five times Mikulski's total. Ideologically, Mikulski and Mathias agreed on many issues, such as closing tax loopholes and easing taxes on the middle class. On two issues, however, Mathias argued to reform Congress and the U.S. tax system to address inflation and corporate price fixing, contrary to Mikulski. In retrospect, The Washington Post felt the election was "an intelligent discussion of state, national, and foreign affairs by two smart, well-informed people".

 Missouri 

 Nevada 

Incumbent Democrat Alan Bible decided to retire instead of seeking a fifth term. Republican nominee Paul Laxalt won the open seat.

Former Governor Paul Laxalt won by less than 700 votes, becoming one of the few bright spots in a bad year for Republicans.  He beat Lieutenant Governor Harry Reid.  Reid would succeed Laxalt twelve years later.

 New Hampshire 

The New Hampshire election resulted in the longest contested election for the U.S. Congress in United States history.

In 1973, then-incumbent senator Norris Cotton announced he would not seek re-election. Republican strategists admitted that it would be tough for their party to hold on to the seat.

The campaign of 1974 pitted Democrat John A. Durkin, who had served as New Hampshire's Insurance Commissioner and as Attorney General, against Republican Louis C. Wyman, a conservative, widely known member of the United States House of Representatives from New Hampshire's 1st congressional district.  As Wyman was the more experienced politician, he was predicted by many to win handily.

On election day, Wyman won with a margin of just 355 votes.  Durkin immediately demanded a recount, which, completed November 27, 1974, declared Durkin the winner by a margin of 2 votes. Republican Governor Meldrim Thomson Jr. awarded Durkin a provisional certificate of election.

Wyman promptly appealed to the New Hampshire State Ballot Law Commission.  Durkin tried to defeat the appeal in the New Hampshire courts. The state ballot commission conducted its own partial recount and announced on December 24, 1974, that Wyman had won by just two votes. Governor Thomson rescinded Durkin’s certificate, and awarded a new credential to Wyman.

Senator Cotton resigned on December 31, 1974, and Governor Thomson appointed Wyman to fill the remainder of the term, which would expire January 3, 1975.

The election contest was not settled, however, and eventually a new election would be called in 1975.

 New York 

Incumbent Republican U.S. Senator Jacob Javits won against Democratic challenger Ramsey Clark in a three way election.

 North Carolina 

Incumbent Democrat Sam Ervin chose to retire.  The general election was fought between the Democratic nominee Robert Morgan and the Republican nominee William Stevens.

 North Dakota 

Incumbent Republican Milton Young was re-elected to his sixth term, defeating North Dakota Democratic-NPL Party candidate William L. Guy, a former Governor of North Dakota.

Only Young filed as a Republican, and the endorsed Democratic candidate was William L. Guy of Bismarck, North Dakota, who had served as Governor of the state from 1961 to 1973; and had presumably left the office to seek the senate seat. Young and Guy won the primary elections for their respective parties. Guy, who was very popular as governor throughout the state, and Young, who had a high approval rating as senator for the state, created the closest ever election for one of North Dakota's senate seats. Young won the election by only 177 votes, and Guy retired from politics.

Two independent candidates, James R. Jungroth and Kenneth C. Gardner, also filed before the deadline. Jungroth's platform was based on his opposition to strip mining the state's coal reserves. Gardner would later run for the state's other seat in 1988 against then incumbent Quentin Burdick.

 Ohio 

Incumbent Democrat Howard Metzenbaum was running for election his first full term after he was appointed in 1974 by Ohio governor John J. Gilligan to fill out the Senate term of William B. Saxbe, who had resigned to become United States Attorney General. Metzenbaum lost the primary election to retired astronaut John Glenn, who went on to win the general election and win every county in the state over Republican Ralph Perk, Mayor of Cleveland

 Oklahoma 

Incumbent Republican Henry Bellmon narrowly won re-election to a second term, beating Representative Ed Edmondson by nearly 4,000 votes.

 
 
 

 Oregon 

Incumbent Republican Bob Packwood won re-election to a second term. Betty Roberts was chosen to replace former U.S. senator Wayne Morse, who won the Democratic primary but died before the general election.

The Democratic primaries were held on May 28, 1974. Incumbent senator Bob Packwood was running for re-election after his upset victory against popular incumbent Democrat Wayne Morse in 1968 made him the youngest member of the Senate.

In the Democratic primary, former senator Morse, trying to win back the seat he had for 24 years before losing to Packwood six years earlier, faced Oregon State Senate President Jason Boe and several other candidates for a chance to take back his Senate seat. Boe, who was 45, made Morse's age, 73, an issue in the race while Morse said his experience in the Senate made him a stronger candidate. Boe called for a series of debates around the state, but Morse refused. He went on to defeat Boe 49% to 39%, and planned to use the same strategy in the general election against Packwood, whose narrow victory over Morse 6 years earlier was attributed to Packwood's superior performance at a debate in Portland late in the campaign.

In July, Morse was hospitalized in Portland with what was originally described as a serious urinary tract infection. His condition deteriorated and he died on July 22. The death was originally reported to have been caused by kidney failure, but it was later revealed that Morse died of leukemia; Boe apparently knew of the diagnosis during the campaign but did not make it a campaign issue.

The Oregon Democratic State Central Committee met on August 11, two days after Richard Nixon resigned the Presidency. They chose State senator Betty Roberts over Boe to replace Morse as the Democratic nominee. Roberts, an Oregon State Senator, had run for the Democratic nomination for Governor that year, but lost in the May primary to eventual general election winner Robert W. Straub.

Outgoing Oregon governor Tom McCall, who had decided not to run in 1968, had pledged to Packwood a year earlier that he would not challenge him in 1974. But as his term as governor ended, McCall began reconsidering his decision, believing he would bring more integrity to the job. In March 1974, at a dinner party held at Packwood's Washington D.C. home in McCall's honor, McCall informed Packwood that he would challenge him. The news of McCall's change of plans soon reached the media. Eventually, McCall decided that he had little chance against Packwood, who had similar positions to his own and had a reputation for ruthless campaigning that McCall did not share. McCall did not run, and Packwood was unopposed in the Republican primary.

Strong Democratic gains were predicted, giving Roberts a good chance at an upset. In addition, the Senate had no female members and Roberts was one of three women (along with Barbara Mikulski in Maryland and Gwenyfred Bush in South Carolina) seeking a Senate seat. But on the issues, Packwood and Roberts shared many positions, such as on abortion, military spending, and the environment. Moreover, Packwood had distanced himself from Watergate, calling for Nixon's impeachment and denouncing Gerald Ford's pardon of Nixon. Roberts was also at a financial disadvantage, having entered the race late and facing debt from her failed gubernatorial run; Packwood was able to use money he had raised for a primary challenge that never materialized, and led in most polls by a double-digit margin.

Roberts lost the election to Packwood 54% to 44%. Packwood was the only Oregon Republican up for re-election to keep his seat: Democrats won every other available seat. In the Governor's race, Bob Straub, who beat Roberts in the Democratic primary, defeated Vic Atiyeh to become the first elected Democratic governor since 1956; in the U. S. House of Representatives races, Les AuCoin won an open seat in the 1st district and in the 4th district, Jim Weaver upset incumbent John Dellenback.

After the election, Roberts, whose criticism of Packwood's ethics was a theme in her campaign, considered filing a lawsuit against Packwood for misrepresenting her positions on gun control, abortion, and Social Security in campaign advertisements, but later dropped the idea.

 Pennsylvania 

Incumbent Republican Richard Schweiker won re-election, defeating Democratic nominee Peter F. Flaherty, Mayor of Pittsburgh.

In the general election campaign, Schweiker faced popular Pittsburgh mayor Peter Flaherty. Both candidates, as highlighted by a New York Times article, "[took] firm stands against inflation, recession, big spending by the Federal Government and abortion on demand." Schweiker, who was endorsed by the AFL–CIO, distanced himself from the Richard Nixon administration, specifically the Watergate scandal, by emphasizing his early calls for Nixon's resignation and the fact that he was on Nixon's "enemies list."

In the end, Schweiker won re-election with 53% of the popular vote, with Flaherty winning 45.9%. Schweiker carried 53 of Pennsylvania's counties, a decrease from the 59 counties he carried in the 1968 election. Flaherty had a strong showing in Allegheny County, which contains his home town of Pittsburgh, which Schweiker had won in 1968. The final election results represented a political divide between the eastern and western portions of the state, Schweiker in the east and Flaherty in the west, with the exception of Flaherty's slim 4,491 vote victory in Philadelphia.

 South Carolina 

The 1974 South Carolina United States Senate election was held on November 5, 1974 to select the U.S. Senator from the state of South Carolina.  Incumbent Democratic senator Fritz Hollings easily defeated Republican challenger Gwen Bush to win his third term. Both Hollings and Bush faced no opposition in their party's primaries which allowed both candidates to concentrate solely on the general election.  The Watergate scandal caused the Republicans to perform poorly nationwide in 1974 and Gwen Bush was little more than a sacrificial lamb.  The main focus of the voters in South Carolina was on the competitive gubernatorial contest and Hollings easily cruised to a comfortable re-election.

 

|-
| 
| colspan=5 |Democratic hold'''
|-

South Dakota

Utah 

Incumbent Republican U.S. Senator Wallace F. Bennett did not run for re-election to a fifth term, but retired. Salt Lake City mayor Jake Garn won the Republican nomination, while U.S. representative Wayne Owens won the Democratic nomination. Garn defeated Owens, 50% to 44%, with third-party candidate Bruce Bangerter winning 6% of the vote.

Vermont 

Incumbent Republican George Aiken did not run for re-election to another term in the United States Senate. Democratic candidate, attorney and prosecutor Patrick Leahy defeated the Republican candidate, congressman Richard W. Mallary to succeed him. Leahy was the first Democrat ever elected to this seat, and, as of 2021, remains the only Democrat ever elected to the Senate from Vermont.

Washington

Wisconsin 

Incumbent Democrat Gaylord Nelson won re-election to a third term over Tom Petri, State senator since 1973.

See also 
 1974 United States elections
 1974 United States gubernatorial elections
 1974 United States House of Representatives elections
 93rd United States Congress
 94th United States Congress
 Watergate Babies
 Watergate scandal

Notes

References 
 
 Tibbetts, Donn.  The Closest U.S. Senate Race in History, Durkin v. Wyman.  [Manchester, N.H.]: J.W. Cummings Enterprises, 1976.